Adamsville is an unincorporated community in Harrison County, West Virginia, United States. Its post office  is closed.

References

Unincorporated communities in Harrison County, West Virginia
Unincorporated communities in West Virginia